An indirect election for the position of President of the Hellenic Republic was held by the Hellenic Parliament on 18 December 1974.

Following the restoration of democracy in Greece, the 17 November 1974 election, and the abolition of the Greek monarchy in the 8 December 1974 referendum, distinguished jurist and former president of the Council of State Michail Stasinopoulos was elected as the first, President of the Third Hellenic Republic on 18 December with 206 votes. He served as a provisional president until July 1975, when, following the promulgation of a new constitution Konstantinos Tsatsos replaced him as the first "regular" President with a full five-year term.

References

1974
1970s in Greek politics
1974 elections in Greece